Bugaboo, bug-a-boo or bug a boo may refer to:

 Bugaboo, a legendary scary creature, see bogeyman
 Bugaboo, a thin straight piton or metal spike, perfect for thin, deep seams
 Bugaboo International B.V., a Dutch design company that makes strollers for infants and toddlers
 Bugaboo, A fictional insectoid alien from children's CGI television series Monster Buster Club

In geography:
 Bugaboo Canyon, a small canyon in the McGee Creek State Park area of Oklahoma, United States
 Bugaboo Swamp, a portion of the Okefenokee Swamp, located in the southern portion of Georgia, United States
 Bugaboo Scrub Fire, a fire that was named for the above swamp
 The Bugaboos, a granite mountain range in the Purcell Mountains of eastern British Columbia, Canada
 Bugaboo Provincial Park, a park in that area
 Bugaboo Spire, a peak in The Bugaboos

In media
 Bug-a-Booo, a comic strip by Mauricio de Sousa about a gang of ghosts, undeads and other Halloween creatures.
 "Bug a Boo", a 1999 song by Destiny's Child
 "Bug a Boo", an episode of the American television series Charmed
 "Bugaboo", a song by Dir En Grey from the album Uroboros, 2008
 Bugaboo (The Flea), a 1983 game written for various 8-bit computers

Other uses
 BugAboo (group), a South Korean girl group

See also 

 Boogaloo
 Bugbear